The fourth season of the Naruto: Shippuden anime series is directed by Hayato Date, and produced by Studio Pierrot and TV Tokyo. They are based on Part II for Masashi Kishimoto's manga series. The season follows Shikamaru Nara attempting to avenge Asuma's death. The fourth season aired from August to December 2008 on TV Tokyo. It was also released on four DVDs in Japan by Aniplex between January 14 and May 13, 2009.

The English dub aired on Disney XD between March 16 and July 23, 2011. The season ran on Adult Swim's Toonami programming block from June 28 to November 8, 2015.

Viz Media released the season in two DVD boxes on April 26 and July 12, 2011. Manga Entertainment collected it in two DVD boxes with the first one released on July 11 and the second set on November 7, 2011.

The broadcast versions from episode 70 to 73 include scenes from the film in the opening themes, while still retaining the original music.


Episode list

Home releases

Japanese

English

References

General
 
 
 

Specific

2008 Japanese television seasons
Shippuden Season 04